Piotr Gawroński (born 25 March 1990) is a Polish former cyclist, who rode professionally between 2012 and 2014 for the  team.

Major results

2007
 3rd Time trial, UEC European Junior Road Championships
2008
 1st Stage 1 Peace Race Juniors
 3rd Road race, UEC European Junior Road Championships
2010
 1st  Road race, UEC European Under-23 Road Championships
2012
 1st Prologue Bałtyk–Karkonosze Tour
 1st  Young rider classification Szlakiem Grodów Piastowskich
2014
 1st Stage 1 (TTT) Dookoła Mazowsza

References

External links

1990 births
Living people
Polish male cyclists
Place of birth missing (living people)